This List of members of the American Academy of Arts and Letters Department of Art shows the members of one of the three departments of the American Academy of Arts and Letters.

After being nominated by current members, new members are selected in two elections, the first by the department they join (Art, Literature or Music). Candidates who receive the most votes in their own department are then voted on by the entire membership.

Current members

A
 Robert Adams, 2014

B
 Jennifer Bartlett, 2003  
 Lynda Benglis, 2012  
 Lee Bontecou, 2004

C
 Vija Celmins, 1996 
 John Chamberlain, 1990 
 Chuck Close, 1992

D
 Mark Di Suvero, 1986  
 Elizabeth Diller, 2012  
 Jim Dine, 1980  
 Lois Dodd, 1998  
 Rackstraw Downes, 1999

E
Nicole Eisenman, 2018
Peter Eisenman, 2001

F
 Eric Fischl, 2006  
 Kenneth Frampton, 2012  
 Mary Frank, 1984

G
 Frank O. Gehry, 1987  
 Robert Gober, 2012  
 Red Grooms, 2000

H
 Ann Hamilton, 2014  
 Mary Heilmann, 2017  
 Steven Holl, 2000  
Jenny Holzer, 2018
 Richard Hunt, 1998

I 
 Robert Irwin, 2007

J
 Yvonne Jacquette, 2003  
 Bill Jensen, 2014  
 Jasper Johns, 1973  
 Joan Jonas, 2016

K
 Alex Katz, 1988

L
 Alfred Leslie, 2006  
 Maya Lin, 2005

M
 Robert Mangold, 2001  
 Sylvia Plimack Mangold, 2011  
 Brice Marden, 1998  
 Thom Mayne, 2010  
 Julie Mehretu, 2017  
 Richard Meier, 1983  
 Catherine Murphy, 2002

N
 Bruce Nauman, 2001

O
 Claes Oldenburg, 1975  
 Laurie Olin, 2005

P
 Philip Pearlstein, 1982  
 Judy Pfaff, 2009  
 James Stewart Polshek, 2005  
 Martin Puryear, 1992

R
 Paul Resika, 1994   
 Dorothea Rockburne, 2001  
 Edward Ruscha, 2001

S
 David Salle, 2016  
 Peter Saul, 2010  
 Annabelle Selldorf, 2017  
 Richard Serra, 1995  
 Joel Shapiro, 1998  
 Cindy Sherman, 2005  
 Kiki Smith, 2005  
 Pat Steir, 2016  
 Robert A. M. Stern, 2011  
Sarah Sze, 2018

T
 Wayne Thiebaud, 1986  
 Billie Tsien, 2007  
 James Turrell, 2011  
 Richard Tuttle, 2013

V

 Ursula von Rydingsvard, 2008

W
 Kara Walker, 2012
 Stanley Whitney, 2017
 Tod Williams, 2009
 Terry Winters, 2013

Deceased members
 Complete list at

See also
List of members of the American Academy of Arts and Letters Department of Literature
List of members of the American Academy of Arts and Letters Department of Music

External links
List of members of Department of Art of the American Academy of Arts and Letters

American Academy of Arts and Letters Department of Art, List of members of the